Christianismi Restitutio (The Restoration of Christianity) was a book published in 1553 by Michael Servetus. It rejected the Christian doctrine of the Trinity and the concept of predestination, which had both been considered fundamental since the time of St. Augustine and emphasized by John Calvin in his magnum opus, Institutio Christianae Religionis. Servetus argued that God condemns no one who does not condemn himself through thought, word or deed. It also contained, incidentally and by way of illustration, groundbreaking views on pulmonary circulation based on the discoveries of Arab Muslim physician Ibn Al Nafis, which challenged the incorrect teachings of Galen.

Reception 

After sending an early draft of Christianismi Restitutio  to the theologian John Calvin, Servetus was arrested by the Inquisition in Vienne, but he managed to escape from imprisonment. However, with the help of John Calvin he was later captured in Geneva and found guilty of spreading heresies. On October 27, 1553, he was burned at the stake in Geneva.

Almost all copies of his book were burned shortly after its publication, although some copies survived and are currently kept in Bibliothèque nationale de France, Edinburgh University Library, Austrian National Library and the Royal Library of Belgium.

Non-theological significance 

Servetus' discussion of the pulmonary circulation in Christianismi Restitutio in the middle of the 16th century is often falsely recognized as the most accurate and complete description at that time. In actuality his work was likely based on the work of Muslim physician Ibn al-Nafis (1213-1288) who was the first to accurately describe the human pulmonary circulation and theorize the existence of capillary networks, some 300 years earlier. Since the information on pulmonary circulation was suppressed with the theological work in which it was embedded, the function of the pulmonary circulation was forgotten until published by Sir William Harvey seventy-five years later in his work De Motu Cordis.

Further reading 
 Out of the Flames:  The Remarkable Story of a Fearless Scholar, A Fatal Heresy and One of the Rarest Books in the World by Lawrence Goldstone and Nancy Bazelon Goldstone. New York: Broadway Books, 2002. Republished as: Out of the Flames: The Story of One of the Rarest Books in the World, and How it Changed the Course of History by Lawrence Goldstone and Nancy Goldstone. London: Century, 2003.

References 

1553 books
Christian theology books
Anatomy books